Ida Marie Holen (born 29 March 1958) is a Norwegian politician for the Progress Party.

She served as a deputy representative to the Parliament of Norway from Buskerud during the term 2009–2013.

She has been a member of Ål municipal council.

References

1958 births
Living people
People from Ål
Deputy members of the Storting
Progress Party (Norway) politicians
Buskerud politicians
Women members of the Storting
Place of birth missing (living people)
21st-century Norwegian women politicians